Múcura Island (Isla Múcura) is a coral island located in the Archipelago of San Bernardo, Gulf of Morrosquillo, Caribbean Sea. It is governed by Colombia, and is a part of the District of Cartagena de Indias.

Lodging facilities are present on the island.

Flora and fauna 
The island has a significant amount of Mangrove trees.

See also 
 Caribbean region of Colombia
 Insular region of Colombia
 List of islands of South America

References 

Caribbean islands of Colombia
Underwater diving sites in the Caribbean
Underwater diving sites in Colombia